Abaraeus is a genus of longhorn beetles of the subfamily Lamiinae, containing the following species:

 Abaraeus cuneatus Jordan, 1903
 Abaraeus curvidens Aurivillius, 1908

References

Pteropliini
Cerambycidae genera